This is a list of television series cancelled before airing an episode.  While many television shows are produced as pilots that never air on television or in any medium, the scope of this article is to list shows that were officially announced to be broadcast, but then canceled prior to the scheduled debut on the original network. Shows are listed in alphabetical order with the slated year of debut (plus timeframe, or specific premiere date, where applicable), known cast and plot information, the reason for cancellation (if known), and what happened to the series after cancellation.

A
 The Activist (October 22, 2021)
Created by Global Citizen and Live Nation, this reality competition show, hosted by Usher, Priyanka Chopra and Julianne Hough, was to focus on six activists working to bring meaningful change to one of three urgent causes: health, education and the environment, with the finalists attending the 2021 G20 summit to raise funds for their cause and the one raising the most funds being crowned "The Activist". The way the contestants' success would have been judged, which was by social media engagement and assessments by the hosts, drew immense backlash. Originally slated for an October premiere date on CBS for the 2021-22 season, the show was later reformatted to a documentary special following the controversy which, as of December 31, 2022, hasn't been aired.

 All My Babies' Mamas (early 2013)
An American reality show set to air on Oxygen starring rapper Shawty Lo (who died in 2016), and showcasing his life as the father of eleven children by ten different women. The series was canceled after an online petition and public outcry.

 All-Star Celebrity Bowling (fall 2014)
Revival of the 1970s bowling game show Celebrity Bowling that was to air on AMC. The channel had picked up the show in May 2014 before deciding in October to cancel all but one of its unscripted programs, including those that had not yet made it to air. All-Star Celebrity Bowling was one of at least three shows canceled in this manner.

 Amazon High (1997)
 Selma Blair starred as a present-day orphaned high school student who accidentally travels back in time to the mythical days of the Amazons. Amazon High, co-starring Karl Urban, was proposed as a third show set in the Hercules and Xena mythological genre, but has never been aired. Later, portions of the pilot were adapted and edited into the Xena: Warrior Princess episode "Lifeblood" in 2000.

 American Princess (2003)
American reality show produced by NBC in 2003. It involved 20 American women who are average, plain, and rather ill-mannered, getting taken to London to master the finer arts of British society and be crowned "American Princess" and earn valuable prizes. The series was set as a midseason replacement sometime in the 2003–04 season, but never made it to air. Two years later, the series was finally run on WE tv, where it was a success and later picked up for another season, before ultimately ending in 2007.

 Angels '88/'89 (1988 & 1989)
Attempted revival of Charlie's Angels that was proposed for the then-new Fox network produced by Aaron Spelling in the wake of the 1988 Writers Guild of America strike, allowing the re-use of scripts from the original series without the need for writers. Four women (including Téa Leoni) were selected to star. It was renamed Angels 89 due to production delays taking it into the following calendar year. It was eventually abandoned the next year after the settlement of the writer's strike.

 Aquaman (2006)
 A live-action failed pilot for The CW, that never aired on the network. It was later released digitally on iTunes on July 25, 2006. Within a week, it reached the number-one spot on the list of most downloaded TV shows on the digital store's list, and it held that spot for over a week.

 El ático (2022)
Spanish talk show meant to be hosted by Ion Aramendi on Telecinco on the weekday 8 p.m. timeslot. Four pilots were taped before Telecinco's parent company Mediaset España decided against moving ahead with the format.

B
 Bastards (September 2019)
A dark drama series based on the Israeli series Nevelot starring Richard Gere that was given a straight-to-series order in late 2018 by Apple TV+. It was said to focus on two Vietnam veterans and best friends, and would have been Gere's highest-profile TV role. Howard Gordon and Warren Leight collaborated on two scripts for Bastards, but Apple was concerned about the "show's tone of vigilante justice" and scrapped the show. A previous attempt at an American adaptation of Nevelot was in development at HBO in 2015 before it was eventually scrapped.

 The Big D (July 7, 2022)
An American reality dating competition show that was scheduled to air on TBS, hosted by JoJo Fletcher and Jordan Rodgers. It was set to focus on divorced couples living together and looking for love with other contestants, with one participant not in a relationship being eliminated each episode. On June 16, 2022, the series was cancelled before it could air and was written as a "tax write-off". On November 29, 2022, it was announced the series will now air on USA Network.

 Bill and Martha (Fall 1964)
An American situation comedy starring William Bendix and Martha Raye that was scheduled to air on CBS, but due to the purported shaky health of Bendix the network decided not to air the program. This action resulted in a lawsuit from Bendix for $2.658 million in May, with the actor stating that the decision hurt his career and further that he was in excellent health and could perform all of the requirements of the agreement. The case was settled out of court for an undisclosed amount and Bendix subsequently died on December 14, 1964 from complications of stomach cancer and pneumonia.

 Blonde Charity Mafia (July 7, 2009, early 2010)
An American reality series developed by Lifetime, it followed three Washington, D.C. socialites whose lives revolved around charity events. After production was completed on one six-episode season, Lifetime decided to sell the show to The CW network rather than air it itself. The CW scheduled the July premiere date for the series, but later decided to forgo all original programming for that Summer, and program the show as a midseason replacement for the 2009–10 season. Sometime after that decision, the network apparently lost interest in the series; references to it were removed from CW websites, and on December 29 the network officially confirmed that it would not air the show at all. It was apparently dropped in favor of two other reality series developed by The CW, Fly Girls and High Society. The series did air on MTV Australia and MTV New Zealand in August and September 2009.

 Bloomers (1979) 
British sitcom starring Richard Beckinsale. It was in production in 1979 but only five out of six episodes were made before Beckinsale died suddenly. Bloomers was immediately shelved, though the completed episodes were broadcast later in the same year.

 Bridge & Tunnel (2010)
MTV documentary reality show following the lives of young residents on Staten Island. The show was in production and had a scheduled air date for October 2010 but was ultimately pulled for being too similar to the network's hit Jersey Shore despite being slice of life documentary-style in comparison to Jersey Shores show-set residence. The concept of a Staten Island-based reality program was revisited by MTV at the start of 2019 with Made in Staten Island. However, that project would air only three episodes on the network in January 2019 before being pulled due to low ratings and general criticism of a focus on younger people in the show with possible organized crime/mob ties, which MTV exploited with a Sopranos-inspired launch campaign; some of that cast would be involved in another series, Families of the Mafia, meant to take a less confrontational view of Mob families in general; that series would air all six of its episode in the spring of 2020.

C
 Captain America (1998)
 The animated series, based on the comic book character of the same name, was meant to premiere in February on Fox Kids. However, the show was pulled due to conflicts about whether mentions of Nazis as the hero's rivals were appropriate, and Marvel's bankruptcy.

 The Cheetah Girls (2003)
Based on the novel series of the same name, ABC canceled this television series before producing any episodes. However, three TV movies were made.

 Coach (2015) 
 A revival of the 1990s sitcom of the same name, Coach was picked up by NBC straight-to-series without a pilot. Shortly after the series began production, unspecified problems with NBC staff prompted the network to cancel the series before any of its 13-episode order made it to air.

 Coastocoast (September 14, 1978)
This hour-long sitcom about two airline stewardesses, from Bud Yorkin's production company, was originally announced for NBC's Thursday night schedule. However, even Yorkin said he preferred a delayed debut. When Fred Silverman took over the network in June, the show was pulled for "further development" and eventually scrapped.

 Commando Nanny (September 17, 2004)
A sitcom series for The WB, created by Survivor producer Mark Burnett, was based on his life as an au pair (he is also a former squaddie, serving in No3 Para). Scheduled for the WB's Friday comedy block, the show's September 17 debut (which was promoted in fall previews such as TV Guide) was delayed due to Phillip Winchester breaking his foot and being replaced by Owain Yeoman, followed by Gerald McRaney undergoing lung surgery. After the pilot was reshot, Rachel Sweet departed as showrunner, forcing The WB to shelve the sitcom permanently.

 Confederate (2020)
Confederate was a planned, but never made, American alternate history drama television series developed for the network HBO by David Benioff and D. B. Weiss, who had previously developed the HBO series Game of Thrones. The series was to be set in a timeline where the American Civil War ended in a stalemate. The announcement was followed by anger and criticism on social media with some describing it as slavery fan fiction, leading to the hashtag #NoConfederate, which trended number one in the United States and number two worldwide on Twitter in mid 2017. In April 2018, Variety reported the future of Confederate is uncertain. In July 2018, HBO president Casey Bloys confirmed the series was still in development, and hoped it would resume once Benioff and Weiss finished their ongoing commitments. In February 2019, Bloys said the series was still in development and not affected by the controversy, but stated in May 2019 that it was "not on the front burner".  In August 2019, it was announced that Benioff and Weiss had closed a multi-million dollar deal with Netflix and it was reported that the deal "wipes Confederate off HBO's books." In January 2020, Bloys confirmed that the project had been officially canceled without an episode even being made.

 The Cops (between December 2017–Spring 2018)
An adult animated series created by Louis C.K. and Albert Brooks for TBS for its at the time up-and-coming animation block. Other than a few clips shown at the San Diego Comic Con promotion for TBS Animation, nothing else was known about the series. In the wake of the Weinstein effect, sexual misconduct claims emerged against C.K. in November 2017 and were confirmed by him shortly thereafter; subsequently, the series was canceled, leaving Tarantula, Close Enough, Final Space, and a new season of American Dad! the remaining shows off its block (Close Enough was delayed and later moved to HBO Max, with Tarantula ending after one season).

 Cortes (2020)
A historical drama miniseries for Amazon Prime Video created and written by Steven Zaillian and starring Javier Bardem. In September 2020, Amazon decided to withdraw from its partnership with Amblin Television on the miniseries, effectively scrapping the project due to complications from the COVID-19 pandemic.

  Country Style (1964)
A country-themed show made for ATN-7 in Sydney, Australia. In 14 episodes and shot on 16mm film, it had various country music stars appearing as guests, including Rex Dallas and Smoky Dawson. American Marty Robbins, who rarely appeared on television, performed "Devil Woman" and "El Paso". According to associate producers the LeGarde Twins, the show was pulled when host Digby Wolfe began making demands for high pay and luxuries. One episode may have eventually aired on a Saturday morning. The series finally aired 48 years later, debuting on January 2, 2011 on CMC (Country Music Television) in Australia.

D
 Day One (early 2010)
American sci-fi drama from NBC about apartment residents who survive an unknown worldwide cataclysm that destroys modern infrastructure. The show was initially ordered to series, then had its order cut to mini-series, then it was announced the pilot would be retooled as a TV movie, before ending up never airing at all. According to NBC's Angela Bromstad, the show was originally expected to fill the Heroes time slot after the 2010 Winter Olympics. The movie/pilot was directed by Alex Graves, who previously directed the pilot episode for the Fox TV series Fringe and for the NBC TV series Journeyman.

 Despedida de Casado (January 3, 1977)
Brazilian telenovela produced by TV Globo and written by Walter George Durst, starring Regina Duarte and Antônio Fagundes. The telenovela had 30 episodes recorded and was scheduled to premiere on January 3, 1977, however, it was cancelled after being banned by the censorship board of the Brazilian government (at the time, a military dictatorship), claiming that the telenovela preached the dissolution of marriage and was against the morality and good habits. The telenovela's plot was about crisis in marriage and divorce, which became legal in Brazil in December 1977.

 The Dictator (March 15, 1988)
Christopher Lloyd starred as Paul Joseph Domino, the deposed President-For-Life of a small South Seas nation, now running a laundromat with his family in New York's Rego Park area. The pilot episode was well-reviewed, and the series was scheduled to premiere on March 15, 1988.  However, despite receiving significant on-air promotion from CBS, The Dictator did not make it to air due to the 1988 Writers Guild of America strike.

 Do You Trust Me? (2007)
American game show for CBS hosted by Tucker Carlson. Six episodes were produced in 2007, but none aired. The series had a page on the CBS website.

 Domestic Goddess (September 20, 2003)
American cooking series for ABC Family hosted by Roseanne Barr. Thirteen episodes were ordered but Barr underwent an emergency hysterectomy on August 20 which ended the project before it began. A program detailing the show's creation, The Real Roseanne Show, made it to air on ABC that summer.

 The Don Hornsby Show (also billed as The Anchor Hocking Show) (May 22, 1950)
Don "Creesh" Hornsby, a rising 26-year-old comic, was slated to host American television's first-ever late night variety show for NBC. Hornsby suddenly died from a rapid onset of polio the day he was to host his first episode. After a one-week delay, NBC went ahead with the basic format, launching Broadway Open House with Jerry Lester in what would have been Hornsby's time slot. That series would form the most basic structure of the late night television format, and eventually be re-formed as NBC's enduring franchise, The Tonight Show.

 Dreamfinders (1983)
Loosely based on the Epcot ride Journey into Imagination, this show that was slated to premier shortly after the launch of The Disney Channel was to focus on the adventures of Dreamfinder and Figment. Despite being promoted along with the launch of the network, it was mysteriously cancelled shortly after launch with at least one episode partially filmed. There are rumors persisting that say that Dreamfinders did end up airing once on The Disney Channel.

E
 Eight Days a Week (early 2008)
The CW announced this single-camera comedy for mid-season, but no episodes were produced besides the unaired pilot, partly due to the 2007–08 Writers Guild of America strike.

 Escaping the KKK (originally titled Generation KKK) (January 10, 2017)
An A&E docuseries profiling the Ku Klux Klan and members seeking to break away from it. A&E cancelled the series on December 24, 2016 (three weeks before its scheduled premiere), amid revelations that the show's producers made monetary payments to some participants for access (there were also concerns from critics at the time that the show would glorify the all-white organization and its reactionary beliefs).

 Ev and Ocho (September 3, 2012)
A VH1 reality show featuring NFL wide receiver Chad Johnson ("Ocho Cinco") and his then-wife, former Basketball Wives star Evelyn Lozada, had eleven episodes taped. Johnson's arrest for assaulting Lozada, which came three weeks before the show was to premiere, and the subsequent divorce, prompted VH1 to shelve the series.

 Everything Money Can't Buy (Fall 1974)
ABC originally announced this series for its fall schedule, although no pilot had been made, just a sizzle reel. Retooled into the 1976 show Good Heavens.

F
 Famous (June 12, 2016)
This Fox Broadcasting Company comedy was filmed in mock-documentary style at a couples therapy session, and features dating high school teachers Fred and Geneva, both of whom secretly aspire to work in Hollywood. He wants to be a screenwriter and she envisions stardom as a pop diva. The series was picked up in April 2016 and was set to air on June 12, 2016. The series was given a straight to series order with 10 episodes, but a cast had not been chosen in time. The show was later pulled from the schedule with regular summer reruns airing instead.

 Fearless (Fall 2003, early 2004)
The WB announced production of this show for the 2003–04 season that was based on the young adult series of novels by Francine Pascal for its Tuesday-night schedule. The show starred Rachael Leigh Cook, Bianca Lawson, Ian Somerhalder, and Eric Balfour. The network decided to put One Tree Hill in its place (a show that complemented its lead-in, Gilmore Girls, as lead actor Chad Michael Murray appeared in its first two seasons) and move Fearless to midseason after hearing of issues producers were having with the lead character's emotions and later issues of casting. After many delays, the show was canceled. The pilot was the only episode shot, and although it never aired on television, it later leaked on the Internet.Flip It Forward (Fall 2014)
This HGTV series was to feature David Benham and his twin brother, Jason Benham (The Benham Brothers). The already-greenlit series was abruptly canceled in the wake of protests after reports surfaced of the duo's ties to religious groups (the Benhams publicly oppose homosexuality and are also prominent pro-life and Christian activists).Force III (fall 1987)
It was revealed that Orbis Communications and movie producers Edward S. Feldman and Charles R. Meeker were to unveil a syndicated half-hour action drama, Force III, in 1987, with a 65-episode order, from writer Edward J. Lasko. It was meant to be sold to local stations, but was reportedly cancelled before any of the 65 episodes could be aired.Friend Me (early 2013)
A late addition to CBS's 2012–13 schedule, this multi-camera sitcom was scheduled to premiere mid-season. The show never aired due to the suicide of co-creator Alan Kirschenbaum in October 2012. The show's official page disappeared from the CBS website sometime in February 2013, and it was reportedly announced as axed at the August Television Critics Association Press Tour.The Frame (2011)
US network The CW announced this 8-week 16-episode Big Brother-esque reality game show for mid-season in 2011, but it was revealed to be shelved in March 2012.

G
 Garbage Pail Kids (September 19, 1987)
An animated series based on Topps's popular parody of the Cabbage Patch Kids was scheduled to debut on CBS's Saturday-morning schedule, but was canceled before its debut after complaints from parental groups and (like Little Muppet Monsters) replaced by an extra half-hour of Muppet Babies. Although the 13 produced episodes aired in other countries (most notably Iceland), it remained unseen on television in North America. It was not until April 2006 that the complete series was released on DVD by Paramount Home Entertainment.

 Good Grief (August 8, 2014)
Lifetime had announced plans to debut the reality television series, which would have followed the owners of the Johnson Family Mortuary funeral home in Fort Worth, Texas, and began airing promotions for the series. Lifetime decided to cancel the series altogether on July 24, 2014 after several scheduling and filming issues. The program's scrapping ultimately came from the July 15 discovery of eight unattended and/or decomposing bodies at the funeral home, which led to the arrests of owner Dondre Johnson and his wife Rachel Hardy-Johnson. (The funeral home's landlord, who was executing an eviction process, discovered the bodies and alerted authorities; both Dondre and Rachel eventually were sentenced to prison terms.) The funeral home itself had been the subject of an investigation by The Texas Funeral Services Commission and had been scrutinized by critics and the local media regarding their practices and boasting about promoting the series prior to their arrest.

 The Grubbs (November 3, 2002)
An American version of Granada Television's The Grimleys, starring Randy Quaid, Carol Kane, and Michael Cera, which was produced without Granada's input and blasted in early reviews as "the worst sitcom ever produced". Scheduled for Sunday nights at 9:30 PM, the show was scrapped two days before its debut. Fox Entertainment President Gail Berman stated that it "failed to live up to its creative potential".

 Guasap! (Fall 2012)
Comedy/talk-show set to air on Cuatro. It was canned after Cuatro's parent group Mediaset España rejected four pilots and all parties involved in the show decided the program's timing was not right.

H
 Hancock Down Under (1968)
British comedian Tony Hancock was set to star in the Australian-produced TV series, playing himself as a new immigrant to Australia. After shooting the first three episodes, Hancock, whose career had faltered because of his alcoholism, committed suicide. The series was canceled without airing, although the three episodes were eventually edited together and broadcast in Australia as The Tony Hancock Special in 1972.

 Head of the Class (June 24, 1960)
This summer prime time game show hosted by Gene Rayburn was slated to air on NBC's Friday-night schedule from 8:30 to 9:00 p.m., and TV Guide listed this as such; however, NBC changed its plans and opted to fill the time period with reruns of Wichita Town. The pilot is among the holdings of the UCLA Film & Television Archive. This unaired show is not to be confused with the sitcom of the same name which ran on ABC from 1986 to 1991.

 Heads Up! (2016)
Game show based on the popular app, produced by Ellen DeGeneres and hosted by Loni Love. 65 episodes were completed for HLN but the network shelved the show after refocusing its programming on news. The show eventually aired in Canada on the Family Channel and its sister channel, Family Chrgd.

 Heathers' (2018)
TV show based on the 1988 movie of the same name was set to air on the Paramount Network on March 7, 2018, but was delayed due to the Stoneman Douglas High School shooting. Paramount would later announce the show would premiere on July 10, 2018, but then cancelled the project a few weeks later on June 1, 2018. On October 4, 2018, Variety reported that a truncated version of the series would air over five nights beginning on October 25, 2018, a run itself truncated and edited due to the Tree of Life synagogue shooting.

 Heavens to Betsy (1995)
Dolly Parton starred in this American half-hour comedy for CBS. Six episodes were made but none aired. The concept was later reused in the 1996 CBS TV movie Unlikely Angel.

 Hieroglyph (early 2015)
Fox gave this historical action drama set in ancient Egypt a 13-episode straight-to-series order in October 2013 and released a trailer in May 2014. The network subsequently canceled the series in July 2014, after a single episode had been shot and several scripts had been written.

 Hollyweird (1998)
A show about "the adventures of an intrepid pair of friends from Ohio who take their love for the macabre and use it to solve crimes plaguing Los Angeles", the show was to star Melissa George, Bodhi Elfman and Fab Filippo. The pilot was ordered to series; however, Fox's tinkering and delays frustrated creator Shaun Cassidy, who pulled out of the project, saying that Fox had forced him to spend "much of the last year trying to fix something I never viewed as broken in the first place." Ultimately, production never went ahead on the show.

 Hooligan's Island (2013)
A projected British sitcom television series created by, written by and starring Ade Edmondson and Rik Mayall. The show was to be a spin-off sequel to Mayall and Edmondson's BBC Two sitcom, Bottom, which ran from 1991 to 1995, and was based on the sitcom's 1997 stage tour, Bottom Live 3: Hooligan's Island, with the show's characters Richie and Eddie stranded on a desert island. It was due to air on BBC Two in 2013. On 15 October 2012, Edmondson announced during an interview with BBC Radio Essex that he had pulled out of the new series of Hooligan's Island stating that he wished to pursue other interests.

 Hoyt'n Andy's Sportsbender (1995) 
An animated sitcom produced by Jumbo Pictures and Sunbow Entertainment that was planned to air on ESPN in 1995. However, the series was cancelled before it aired as the channel was acquired by The Walt Disney Company alongside ABC. The series ended up airing in its entirety on RTÉ2 in Ireland and Studio 23 in the Philippines. In the United States, the series was released on Tubi in the mid-late 2010s.

 Hotel Story (1977)
This Australian series made by Crawford Productions was cancelled by Network Ten before a single episode aired and only seven episodes filmed. After Network Ten cancelled the series, Crawford Productions found their series' contract had never been signed, so they had no legal redress. The first four episodes later went to air as a "miniseries" screened over two nights (July 13 and December 27, 1977).

I
 Immigrants (August 12, 2004)
This animated series from Klasky Csupo for Spike TV featured a story about two immigrants – Jóska and Vladislav (from Hungary and Russia, respectively) – as they adjust to their new life in the United States. Six episodes were ordered, with a two-hour marathon to begin the run. However, for reasons unknown, the series never aired. The series was made into a motion picture for theatrical release, which was released on DVD in the United States in 2009.

 In The Dark (Summer 1997)
The WB was slated to air an American version of a British game show of the same name on its prime-time Sunday schedule, but it was removed before its premiere. It is unrelated to the 2019 dramedy of the same name which airs on The CW.

 The IT Crowd (US Adaptation) (early 2008, Fall 2008)
NBC slated an American adaptation of the British comedy series of the same name with an American cast (although Richard Ayoade reprised his role as Moss). Jessica St. Clair played the female lead Jen, and Joel McHale played Roy. The show taped its pilot before a live audience on February 16, 2007, and was picked up for a midseason debut in 2008, but was later pushed back to air during the 2008–09 season. On September 13, 2007, The Hollywood Reporter reported that NBC was considering pulling the plug on the show. When NBC announced its schedule for the 2008–09 season, The IT Crowd was not on it, and McHale had since been cast as the lead for Community. The pilot has been seen on various video-sharing sites, including YouTube.

J
 The Jake Effect (early 2002)
Seven episodes of this sitcom starring Jason Bateman were produced to premiere in midseason 2002, but NBC canceled the series before a single episode aired. In 2006, Bravo aired the first six episodes of the series as part of its "Brilliant But Canceled" block.

 Jingles (2008)
A CBS series produced by Mark Burnett in which teams compete to create new advertising jingles for brand-name products. It starred Gene Simmons and Kimberly Caldwell.

L
 Law & Order: For the Defense (Fall 2021)
In May 2021, NBC had given a straight-to-series order to Law & Order: For the Defense, a new legal drama from Law & Order franchise creator Dick Wolf, would premiere during the 2021–22 television season. In July 2021, multiple trade publications reported that NBC and Wolf had mutually agreed to scrap the series, which had not yet cast any roles, and that they would instead revive the original Law & Order (which had ended production in 2010) for the time slot.

 Let's Dance (November 23, 2009)
ABC ordered five episodes of an intended comedy-celebrity dance competition, to be hosted by Kathy Griffin; however, casting difficulties led to the series being scrapped.

 Liza and David (October or November 2002)
This planned reality series, about the lives of Liza Minnelli and her then-husband, producer David Gest, was abruptly canceled by VH1 in October just before its debut.

 Lizzie McGuire reboot for Disney+ (2020)
Originally announced to much fanfare along with Disney+ at the D23 expo in 2019, this reboot of the early 2000s Disney Channel series shot two episodes, and had a brief clip appear during a Disney+ sizzle reel on New Year's Day 2020. However, just days later, it was announced that production was paused due to the exit of the original creator Terri Minsky over creative differences, and ultimately by year's end, Hilary Duff (Lizzie) would reveal on her Instagram page that the show had been shelved.

 The Love Nest (Fall 1974)
CBS originally announced this sitcom to air in its fall schedule on Friday nights. It starred Charles Lane and Florida Friebus as widowed senior citizens who live together in a Florida trailer park.

 Lost in the USA (Fall 2001)
An American reality show scheduled for Sunday at 7 on The WB, it was to follow four groups of young people on a cross-country scavenger hunt. It was canceled due to troubles at the production company Artists Television Group.

 Loveland (2009)
British dating game show that was to be aired on Sky One but was cancelled due to production costs.

M

 Made by Maddie (September 13, 2020)
A Nickelodeon animated series for preschoolers (originally titled Fashion Ally) about 8-year-old Maddie (voiced by Alyssa Cheatham) "as she uses her imagination and design ingenuity to turn every problem into a positive with the perfect fashion fix." around New York City. It was pulled from the schedule on September 4, 2020, following scrutiny over similarities between the program and the Matthew A. Cherry Oscar-winning animated short, Hair Love. In March 2021, Brian Robbins, President of ViacomCBS Kids & Family, was reported by Deadline Hollywood as saying "We'll probably have an announcement soon about the strategy for Made By Maddie but I'm not ready to tell you yet." On August 17, 2021, the trademark for the series was changed to abandoned.

 Made in Kentucky (2018)
MTV reality show following young people and their shenanigans in Kentucky.

 Mail Order Family (intended for 2017)
An ordered NBC sitcom about a widowed American single father who marries a mail-order bride from the Philippines. Executive producer and co-creator Jackie Clarke based the series on her own experiences growing up with her Filipina stepmother (which was previously a web animated series, which was covered in a segment of the radio show This American Life), and intended to portray the character as a strong woman who helped her overcome the death of her birth mother. Less than three days after announcing the project, NBC decided not to move forward with a pilot after protests from the Asian-American community and advocates for trafficked women and mail-order brides after a Change.org petition protesting the project garnered nearly 10,000 signatures. NBC released a statement stating, "We purchased the pitch understanding that it would tell the creator's real-life experience of being raised by a strong Filipina stepmother after the loss of her own mother...The writer and producer have taken the sensitivity to the initial concept to heart and we have chosen not to move forward with the project at this time." Dr. E. J. R. David and Dr. Alicia del Prado, co-chairs of the Asian American Psychological Association's Division on Filipino Americans, wrote a column in Psychology Today about what lessons could be learned from the handling of the show, mentioning how future efforts should collaborate from people from the related community and not "trivialize, make light of, or laugh at serious real-life issues" such as human trafficking or buying human beings.

 Mainly For Men (1969)
A BBC magazine program aimed at men. The pilot was made in 1969, but went unaired until 1992 on the TV Hell program as an example of some of the worst television ever made.
 
 Manchester Prep (1999)
This US series prequel to the 1999 film Cruel Intentions was commissioned by Fox and advertised as a new series but, perhaps due to its controversial subject matter involving teen sexuality, was canceled after two completed episodes. The pilot was later partially refilmed to add nudity and adult subject matter, and released as the R-rated direct-to-video film Cruel Intentions 2, and is now known more for being the first major role for actress Amy Adams.

 Man vs. Beast (British version, November 1, 2003)
British channel ITV commissioned a six-part series based on the controversial Fox special of the same name. It was withdrawn on October 30 after protests from animal rights groups.

 O Marajá (July 26, 1993)
This Brazilian miniseries produced by Rede Manchete in 1993, which satirized the former president of Brazil Fernando Collor, was canceled before its debut scheduled for July 26, 1993 due to a lawsuit filed by Collor against Rede Manchete, alleging that there was a risk of irreparable damage to his honor if the series were debut. After several months, a court decision in favor of Collor banned the debut of the series. Although the ban was lifted by the court after the Brazilian network appealed, on February 27, 1994, the businessman and owner of Rede Manchete, Adolpho Bloch, decided not to allow the miniseries of being shown on his television network, claiming he did not want to enter into more conflicts with Collor.

 Marie (September 14, 2009)
This American daily talk show from Las Vegas, hosted by Marie Osmond and syndicated by Program Partners, was cleared in 80% of U.S. markets; however, the show's distributor withdrew it from distribution on July 31, roughly six weeks before the show's debut. Some of the stations that picked up the program had also changed their mind and withdrew their commitments. Marie eventually made it to air three years later on Hallmark Channel.

 Match Game (Summer 2004, Fall 2008)
American network Fox promoted a revival of the 1970s game show Match Game called What the Blank!, hosted by Fred Willard and announced by Randy West, for Summer 2004; other than the addition of a "man on the street" segment, the game was faithful to the 1970s format. In 2008, TBS picked up the show as Match Game for its late-night schedule with Andrew Daly as host, but did not air any episodes nor mention the show in any press since then. Other networks rumored to have declined revivals include NBC and GSN. The series eventually returned in 2012 on The Comedy Network in Canada, hosted by Darrin Rose; a primetime U.S. revival eventually was picked up in 2016 with Alec Baldwin as host for ABC.

 The Mayor (Spring 2004)
American sitcom for The WB produced by Adam Sandler. Six episodes were ordered but it was later nixed due to the network reportedly unhappy with the show's creative direction.

 Members Only (Early 2015)
American prime time soap opera following the upstairs-downstairs drama of the powerful and wealthy Holmes family, owners of Connecticut's most exclusive clubs. It was to star Natalie Zea and John Stamos. The series was given a straight to series 13 episode commitment by ABC and was created by Academy Award nominees Susannah Grant and David O. Russell. However, Russell exited the series just a month after it received a straight-to-series order. Only a pilot was filmed before ABC shut down production of the series, and naturally, the pilot never aired.

 The Men's Room (Summer 2005)
An NBC sitcom starring John Cho that was scheduled for midseason in the 2004–05 season, but shut down production after completing only six of its 13-episode order, none of which aired.

 Misconceptions (June 2006)
Ordered as a midseason replacement for The WB's 2005–06 season, this sitcom would have told the story of single mother Amanda Watson (Jane Leeves) and her teenage daughter Hopper (Taylor Momsen) meeting the girl's biological father, Eddie Caprio (Adam Rothenberg), a sperm donor who turns out to have fabricated all the personal details that led Amanda to choose him, but who charms Hopper despite Amanda's distaste. Six episodes were produced, but none of them aired before The WB shut down and merged with UPN to form The CW. The newly merged network aired only two new series during its first season on the air, the rest of its schedule being made up of established series from both networks, leaving no room for Misconceptions.

 Mission Control (Summer 2015)
This NBC sitcom starring Krysten Ritter and Michael Rosenbaum was ordered as a midseason replacement for the 2014–15 season. Casting difficulties would result in the show's cancellation following the completion of the show's pilot episode, which never aired.

 Mr. Dugan (March 11, 1979)
This American sitcom was to premiere on CBS and received substantial on-air promotion. Starring Cleavon Little as a fledgling black congressman, Mr. Dugan was yanked from CBS's schedule on March 7 after members of the Congressional Black Caucus denounced Rep. Dugan's characterization as a bumbling man surrounded by a competent staff who would fix his gaffes, after a special screening.

 Murder Police (2013)
An American animated detective-crime sitcom from Fox created and written by fellow Family Guy writer and producer David A. Goodman and developed by Goodman and Emily Spivey, and was originally set to premiere as part of the network's Animation Domination block for the 2013-14 schedule. However on October 8, 2013, the series was pulled.

 My Man Can (2013)
A British ITV dating game show axed for "being too rubbish" before any of its episodes were aired.

 Mystery Mansion (2003)
 A 13-episode reality television series planned for broadcast by USA Network. The series brought "22 strangers to a secret location to catch a killer among them and claim the $1 million bounty." It was produced by Rocket Science Laboratories.

N
 NASCAR Wives (January 24 and February 15, 2009)
This TLC "docusoap" was to follow the lives of several wives and girfriends of prominent NASCAR drivers. It was to be shown as a special after the 2009 Miss America Pageant, but the network changed its mind and decided to wait until after the 2009 Daytona 500. The series never made it to the air, despite being heavily promoted, due to a conflict between the parties involved with the making of the show. It was reported that TLC wanted to create in-show conflicts that were along the lines of traditional reality programs, namely fights among cast members, while the NASCAR Media Group had no interest in having their drivers and wives portrayed in a Footballers' Wives-esque negative light.

 New Life+: Young Again in Another World (October 2018)
This anime adaptation of a light novel series of the same name by MINE would have follow Renya Kunugi, a Japanese Imperial Army war criminal who was reincarnated in a fantasy world. It was originally announced in May 2018 and would have been animated by Seven Arcs Pictures. The series was scheduled to air in October 2018, but was cancelled in June 2018 after massive backlash; namely, the work's plot, for its insensitive portrayal of historical events, along with author's history of negative remarks towards citizens of China and South Korea. MINE would eventually apologize for his comments and delete his Twitter account. The cancellation also prompted the original light novel and the manga adaptation to be pulled indefinitely, although the manga adaptation resumed publication in August 2018 and ended in December 2021.

 Next Caller (Spring 2013)
An NBC single-camera sitcom about battling radio hosts starring Dane Cook, Collette Wolfe, and Jeffrey Tambor. NBC scheduled the show as a midseason replacement for the 2012–13 season, but production was halted after filming only four of its six episode order, none of which aired.

O
 Off the Wall (Fall 1977)
An NBC general-circumstance comedy series.

 On the Ropes (Fall 1999)
This teen-aimed high school wrestling sitcom was slated to air on Kids' WB Saturday mornings, but likely never went into production after the network acquired Pokémon and instead of its original plan to hold that series until January, carried encores of the syndicated first season's episodes leading into new episodes instead due to the franchise's overwhelming popularity at the time (including new episodes premiering in double-runs to keep up with the Japanese release schedule).

 The Ortegas (2003)
This Fox project starred Cheech Marin and was based on The Kumars at No. 42, a British hit about an Indian family that hosts its own talk show.

 Our Little Genius (January 13, 2010)
Fox picked up this Mark Burnett game show, hosted by Kevin Pollak, for a midseason debut to premiere after American Idol. On January 7, 2010, the premiere was postponed at the request of Burnett due to concerns about the show's integrity; Burnett received reports that some contestants were given excessive information about the questions they were going to be asked, which would violate both FCC rules against manipulation of game shows and network standards and practices. The show was ultimately left unaired. In 2021, the Arizona Republic published accounts from a contestant supporting the reports, revealing that his father had been asked to ensure he knew about certain details that ultimately appeared in a question, and that the show had stopped tape and restarted the game after he had answered a question wrong—with a crew member telling him that they were guaranteeing contestants would win at least $10,000.

P
  The Partner (2004)
 A ten-episode reality television series planned for broadcast by Fox. The series followed two teams of attorneys, one composed of Ivy League graduates and the other of graduates from less prestigious law schools, competing in a series of mock trial competitions. The series was set to premiere in November 2004, although it was delayed and subsequently cancelled in October 2004.

 Popetown (2005)
An animated series commissioned by the BBC which consisted of comical misrepresentations of the Roman Catholic church. After a sustained campaign from senior Catholic theologians, the series was never broadcast on the grounds that it was not of sufficient quality. However, Popetown made its debut on New Zealand music television network C4, and was released on DVD in September 2005.

 Press Ganged (Fall 2004)
A reality television series in which members of the public crew a ship and are judged on their seafaring skills, made by Granada Productions for ITV1 in the UK. Filmed in Summer 2004, it appeared on lists of forthcoming series several times over the next year, but was never broadcast. But, no reason has ever been given for the show's non-appearance.

R
 Raising Caines (1995)
Judge Reinhold was set to star in this family sitcom alongside Mel Harris on NBC. Although it never aired in America, it did air in other countries.

 Rewind (early 1998)
An American Fox sitcom following two advertising executives (Scott Baio and Mystro Clark) both in the current day and in flashbacks to their experiences in the 1970s. The network heavily advertised the series, and it was featured in the 1997 fall preview of TV Guide,  but it was canceled before any showings.

 Rising Star (UK version, early 2015)
The British version of the Israeli real-time talent show was ordered by ITV in November 2013 for broadcast in early 2015. The failure and complexities of the format for the American and German versions of the show ruled out ITV airing a domestic version of the series.

 The Robert Taylor Show (September 19, 1963)
NBC originally slated this Four Star series, starring actor Robert Taylor as a troubleshooter for the U.S. Department of Health, Education, and Welfare with George Segal and Robert Loggia, in its Thursday-night schedule. The series was pulled for undisclosed reasons before airing.

 Roman's Empire (early 2009, Fall 2009)
An American adaptation of the British comedy was planned for ABC's 2008–09 midseason schedule, but was later pushed to the fall season. The project, starring Kelsey Grammer, was officially passed on with Grammer working on Hank (which itself was canceled after airing five episodes).

 Roque Santeiro (1975 version; August 27, 1975)
A Brazilian telenovela produced by TV Globo, written by Dias Gomes, starring Betty Faria, Lima Duarte and Francisco Cuoco. The telenovela was scheduled to premiere on August 27, 1975, however it was cancelled after being banned by the Brazilian government (at the time, a military dictatorship), as wiretaps planted by DOPS, the secret police of the regime, revealed that the telenovela was based on the play O Berço do Herói, also written by Gomes, which had also been banned by government censorship. The government alleged that the telenovela was an offense against morality and good habits. In 1985, after redemocratization, the telenovela was re-recorded and shown in a new version, also written by Gomes, although with a different cast.

 The Runner (January 2002)
LivePlanet, the multi-media company formed by Matt Damon and Ben Affleck, announced this series in 2001 to air on ABC. The premise would have a "runner" compete for a $1 million-plus prize by completing a series of "missions" across the country, while three "agents" try to "capture" him. The show would have an internet twist: not only could potential contestants apply to be runners or agents online, but viewers could win a share of the pot by digging up and sharing clues about the runner's whereabouts on the Web. The series never aired after the September 11 attacks made the premise of a fictional fugitive evading capture for prizes unpalatable, and  LivePlanet shifting to a more traditional drama series, Push, Nevada, which did air in 2002 (but was canceled after seven episodes). A version of the show was finally launched in 2016 by Verizon's go90 streaming service.

S

 Schimmel (2000)
American Fox sitcom starring comedian Robert Schimmel with Mike Scully serving as executive producer was shelved when Schimmel underwent treatment for non-Hodgkin lymphoma.

 Secret Service Guy (1997)
Judge Reinhold was slated to star in this sitcom, which Fox decided not to air.

 Septuplets (early 2003)
Another unrealized Fox commitment, this one about a set of 16-year-old septuplets who run an upscale beachfront hotel with their parents.

  Seriously, Dude, I'm Gay (2004)
 A two-hour reality television special planned for broadcast by Fox. The special was set to air on June 7, 2004, although it was abruptly shelved only eleven days before its intended broadcast. The special depicted two straight men in competition for a $50,000 reward over who could pass themselves off as the more convincing gay man. In addition to competing in daily challenges, the two contestants were required to move into separate lofts with gay roommates, come out to their best friends, and socialize at gay nightclubs. According to executive producer Ray Giuliani, the media monitoring organization GLAAD played a significant role in the special's cancellation.

 Seven Days (1985)
A proposed ABC newsmagazine series to have been anchored by Kathleen Sullivan which would have reviewed the major national and world news stories of the previous week. The network decided against putting the series into production. The show is, according to the network, not to be confused with New Zealand network TV3's 7 Days, a comedic current events game show hosted by New Zealand comedian Jeremy Corbett.

 The Singles Table (early 2007)
NBC announced this sitcom about five people who meet at a wedding after they are placed at the worst table in the event as a midseason replacement. However, the series was pulled without explanation before airing.

 Snip (September 30, 1976)
Comedian David Brenner was slated to star in this sitcom, where he would portray a hairdresser dealing with his ex-wife (Lesley Ann Warren) moving back in with him. Created by James Komack, who had earlier created Chico and the Man and Welcome Back, Kotter, Snip appeared to have great potential and was heavily promoted by NBC; however, after seven episodes were written and five were filmed, the network decided to pull the show at the last minute – so abruptly, in fact, that TV Guide still listed the show in its schedules. Brenner later stated that he believed the pulling was due to fears of controversy, as one of the supporting characters was openly gay, quipping that apparently "In 1976, there were no gay people in America." The five completed episodes later aired in Australia.

 Star Trek: Phase II (Spring 1978)
A planned revival of Star Trek that was to air on a proposed Paramount Pictures television network. When plans for the network fell through with 13 episodes written, the first script of Phase II was given an expanded budget and became Star Trek: The Motion Picture while two others later became episodes of Star Trek: The Next Generation. In 2008, the online fan-film project Star Trek: The New Voyages changed its name to "Star Trek: Phase II" and announced it would be adding at least one "new" character who had been created for the abandoned 1970s series. Pre-production of Phase II had progressed to the point of costume design, preliminary casting and screen tests, and some set design; footage of all three survives and was included as bonus features on the 2001 DVD release of the "Director's Cut" of The Motion Picture.

 Star Wars Detours (2013)
A comedic take on the Star Wars series created by the creators of Robot Chicken.  Disney's acquisition of Lucasfilm caused the series to be put on hold. Star Wars: The Clone Wars was cancelled with rumors stating that Detours would make the move to Disney XD. A total of 39 episodes have been completed, but has been shelved indefinitely as the franchise has taken a new direction under Disney's leadership.

 Still Life (2003)
Fox family drama. Six episodes were made but never aired.

 Street Car Showdown (2021)
A BBC reality show created by Ant and Dec in which teams around the UK are given money to do up second hand cars in 10 days and then race each other in challenges. A TV pilot was shown in 2019, but in 2021 it was announced that it would not be given a full series.
 Sue Sue In The City (2018)
In November 2018, ABC decided to pass on a spinoff of The Middle it ordered to series, which would center on Sue Sue Heck (Eden Sher) moving to Chicago and working in a hotel after the end of The Middle. After ABC canceled the spinoff without airing the pilot, Warner Bros. Television shopped it to other networks but it was never picked up.

 The Surjury (2019–20)
A Channel 4 reality series which was to be presented by Caroline Flack in which a jury of twelve members of the public must decide if an ordinary person must want cosmetic surgery. The show's premise was criticized by several public figures, most notably, Jameela Jamil, when it was announced in October 2019. In February 2020, the series was set aside after Flack's death.

 Surprise with Jenny McCarthy (2012–13)
NBC announced an American adaptation of the British variety show Surprise, Surprise fronted by Jenny McCarthy at upfronts, but it was revealed to have quietly been axed at the January Television Critics Association Press Tour.

T
 Tattertown (1989)
A creation of Ralph Bakshi, this animated series for Nickelodeon was to focus on a community where inanimate objects thrown away as garbage come to life. Nickelodeon had given a 39-episode series order to the show, which would have been the network's first original animated series, but canceled the show in the wake of controversies surrounding Bakshi's other series, Mighty Mouse: The New Adventures. Nickelodeon would air the pilot episode, "Christmas in Tattertown", several times in the late 1980s and early 1990s as a Christmas special. Nickelodeon would eventually add original cartoons with Doug, Rugrats and The Ren & Stimpy Show in 1991.

 Thick and Thin (early 2006)
This sitcom starred Jessica Capshaw as a formerly overweight woman who was struggling to commit herself to a healthier lifestyle – over the objections of her still-overweight family and friends. Six episodes were produced as a midseason replacement for NBC's 2005–06 season, but none were aired. Due to the premature cancellation, Saturday Night Live cast member Chris Parnell and writer Paula Pell returned to working on SNL.

 Three Women (2023)
A Showtime original series based on the 2019 book of the same name by Lisa Taddeo. This series was about a group of women who were going to change their lives. On January 30, 2023, Showtime announced the series would not be airing on the network due to the corporate reorganization of their parent company Paramount Global. On February 7, 2023, it was announced the series will air on Starz.

 Tokyo Babylon 2021 (April 2021)
Anime adaptation of the manga by CLAMP animated by GoHands that was scheduled to air in April 2021. In November 2020, the anime was delayed as it was accused of plagiarizing costumes for the characters Subaru and Hokuto. In December 2020, the company apologized for the plagiarism. In March 2021, it was announced the anime was canceled after more examples of plagiarism were discovered during an investigation by the production committee for the series. CLAMP is planning to work on an entirely new production based on Tokyo Babylon.

 Tonari no 801-chan (early 2009)
Anime adaption of the manga that was scheduled to air on TBS in Japan when the network made the announcement in mid-August 2008. For unknown reasons, the series was later canceled; all of TBS' websites on the show were removed, making the cancellation official, on August 29.

 Top Gear (early 2009)
American version of the cult British show of the same name, hosted by Adam Carolla, Tanner Foust and Eric Stromer, was announced in mid-June by NBC to premiere as a midseason replacement in 2009. Although studio segments which were taped on July 26 for the pilot were generally favorably reviewed (hewing close to the UK version's format), NBC reversed its decision in December, citing the failure of Knight Rider. The show was picked up by History in 2010, with Rutledge Wood and Adam Ferrara replacing  Stromer and Carolla respectively.

 12 Miles of Bad Road (2008)
The brainchild of comedic writer Linda Bloodworth-Thomason, centering around a Texas matriarch who must reconcile her booming real-estate business and immense wealth with the day-to-day struggles of her dysfunctional family life. Ten episodes were ordered by HBO, but only six were shot due to the contemporary writers' strike. On March 17, 2008, HBO confirmed that they were not planning to air the show, and the creators then attempted to shop the episodes around to other networks without success.

U
 Ultimate Slip 'N Slide (Summer 2021)
American game show, based on the Slip 'N Slide water toy that was scheduled to premiere on NBC after its primetime airing of the 2020 Summer Olympics closing ceremony and hosted by Bobby Moynihan and Ron Funches. In July 2021, it reported that production would be halted temporarily after a crew member contracted giardia and it spread through the crew. In August 2021, it was announced that NBC would not be moving forward with the series. Although production was halted 7 weeks into the intended 8 weeks of filming, the format of the show, an ongoing competition with a definitive conclusion, meant that the final competition for the grand prize had not been filmed, and production's attempts to edit the show in absence of its proper conclusion were ultimately passed on. NBC president Susan Rosner Rovner had reportedly spent $18 million on the production of the show. Its slot for lead in program following the closing ceremony of the 2020 Summer Olympics was replaced by Family Game Fight!.

 Untitled Jay Williams project (2015)
Nonfiction docuseries spin-off of Iyanla: Fix My Life on OWN featuring a man fathered 34 children with 17 different women attempting to put his life together with the help of Iyanla Vanzant. Canceled before production was completed.

 Us & Them (2013)
American remake of the popular British sitcom Gavin & Stacey starring Jason Ritter as Gavin and Alexis Bledel as Stacey. After a six-month-long online romance, Gavin, who lives in New York, and Stacey, who lives in Pennsylvania, decide to meet in person. Their crazy families and friends constantly interfere in their budding relationship, which becomes more of a challenge than living in different states. The show was originally given a 13 episode order but that was later cut to 7 episodes, with Fox deciding not to air the completed episodes. It eventually aired on Sony Crackle in the fall of 2018, allowing Sony Pictures Television to air the series in some form.

W
 The Walt Disney Magic Hour (Fall 1998)
A travelogue series of the Walt Disney Parks and Resorts hosted by George Foreman was supposed to debut as part of PAX's debut lineup, but never made it to air.

 Waterfront (early 2007)
CBS ordered this drama, which dealt with the political and personal lives around the mayor of Providence, Rhode Island, as a midseason replacement series and loosely based on the life of former Providence mayor Buddy Cianci. After completing production on five episodes, the network decided to cancel the series, citing creative and financial issues.

 Welcome to the Neighborhood (July 10, 2005)
An ABC reality show that was canceled before airing as its subject matter "risked fostering prejudice" and violating the Fair Housing Act. The series had a conservative white neighborhood choosing their new neighbors from a group of families that were black, Hispanic, and Asian; two gay white men raising an adopted black child; a couple covered in tattoos and piercings; a couple who met at the wife's initiation as a witch; and a poor white family. In 2011, British broadcaster Channel 4 produced a similar format, Love Thy Neighbour, although it would be burned off on a sister channel after three episodes due to low ratings.When I Grow Up (2001)
Also known as Fling. An American romantic comedy for the Fox network created by Glenn Gordon Caron. The show was canceled after six episodes were completed, none of which aired.

 When Women Rule the World (Spring 2007; June 2, 2008)
An American reality show for the Fox network that consisted of 12 women and 12 men sent to a "primitive location" where the men were forced to be subservient to the women, with the women voting off one man per week and the final man left winning $250,000. The show was announced in early 2007, but its debut was delayed to June 2, 2008, then delayed again in April before the network scrapped it permanently. A version was later produced for the United Kingdom.

 Where's the Fire? (Fall 1974)
A sitcom about volunteer firemen; scenes from the pilot were shown in ABC's 1974–75 season promo reel, but the show was withdrawn before its launch.

Y
 The Young Astronauts (early 1986)
This animated series, produced by Marvel Productions, concerned a 21st-century family aboard the interplanetary transport ship Courageous, along with their cat and a comical maintenance "droid".  It was slated to be a Saturday-morning series on CBS, but was ultimately pulled due to the Space Shuttle Challenger disaster on January 28.  A Star Comics comic book series from Marvel Comics was planned to tie into the cartoon, but was also canceled for the same reason. An advertisement that appeared in many comic books in late 1985, which promoted the upcoming fall and winter lineups for CBS Saturday morning, prominently featured a drawing of The Young Astronauts'' along with other shows set to air through the new season.

See also

 Television series
 List of television series canceled after one episode
 List of longest-running United States television series
 List of longest-running U.S. cable television series

References

Cancelled